Elena Dementieva was the defending champion, but lost in second round to Jelena Kostanić.

Lindsay Davenport won the title by defeating Amélie Mauresmo 6–4, 6–4 in the final. It was the 2nd title in the year for Davenport and the 40th title of her career.

Seeds
The first eight seeds received a bye into the second round.

Draw

Finals

Top half

Section 1

Section 2

Bottom half

Section 3

Section 4

External links
 ITF tournament edition details

Bausch and Lomb Championships - Singles
Singles